DCUP (Duncan MacLennan, born 1985) is an Australian music producer.

DCUP can also refer to:
Dicumyl peroxide, a chemical compound

See also
Bra size#Consumer measurement methods, for which "D" is a cup size